Abista  is a river of  Alytus district municipality and Varėna district municipality, Alytus County, southern Lithuania. It flows for 22 kilometres and has a basin area of 87 km².

It is a tributary of the Varėnė, which flows into the Neman via the Merkys.

References

Rivers of Lithuania
Alytus District Municipality